Elxleben (or Elxleben am Steiger, to differentiate it from Elxleben an der Gera) is a municipality in the district Ilm-Kreis, in Thuringia, Germany.

References

Municipalities in Thuringia
Ilm-Kreis
Schwarzburg-Rudolstadt
Former exclaves